Anthems is a compilation by the Slovenian industrial music group Laibach. It was released in 2004 as a double album. The first CD contains a collection of Laibach's best tracks throughout the years, while the second disc accommodates remixes of Laibach songs by different artists. Besides the CDs, the Anthems box also contains a 44-page booklet with a history of Laibach plus several paintings and photographs by and of the band.

Track listing

Disc one
"Das Spiel ist aus" – 3:18
"Tanz mit Laibach" – 4:17
"Final Countdown" – 5:39
"Alle gegen alle" – 3:52
"Wirtschaft ist tot" – 3:45
"God is God" – 3:42
"In the Army Now" – 4:31
"Get Back" – 4:22
"Sympathy for the Devil" – 5:34
"Leben heißt Leben" – 5:26
"Geburt einer Nation" – 4:21
"Opus Dei" – 5:01
"Die Liebe" – 3:52
"Panorama" – 4:52
"Država" – 4:19
"Brat moj" – 6:02
"Mama Leone" – 4:51

Disc two
"Das Spiel ist aus - Ouroborots mix" – 4:05
"Liewerk - 3.Oktober Kraftbach mix" – 4:21
"Wir tanzen Ado Hynkel - Zeta Reticula mix" – 5:39
"Final Countdown - Beyond the infinite Juno reactor mix" – 7:37
"God is God - Optikal vocal mix" – 5:44
"War - ultraviolence meets Hitman mix" – 6:19
"God is God - diabolig mix" – 3:36
"Final Countdown - Mark Stent alternate mix" – 5:48
"Wirtschaft ist tot - late night mix" – 5:22
"Jesus Christ Superstar - Random logic mix" – 6:22
"Wirtschaft - R. Hawtin hardcore noise mix" – 5:18
"Brat moj - Randomlogic mix" – 5:09
"Smrt za smrt - Octex mix" – 7:02
"WAT - iTurk mix" – 5:29

Trivia
 "Mama Leone" was the only new song on this compilation.

References

Laibach (band) albums
2004 compilation albums
2004 remix albums
Mute Records compilation albums
Mute Records remix albums